Ponnumthuruthu also known as Golden Island is an island in Varkala of Trivandrum district in Kerala. It is situated in Anjengo lake. The island is a property of a Valiyapurakkal Family. The island also contain a Hindu temple that is 100 years old. Sivarathri festival Sivarathri is a major festival celebrated at the Siva Parvathi temple at Ponnumthuruthu. It is the festival that makes alive the otherwise less frequented island. Many devotees spend the night on the island during Sivarathri and the place lit with lights is an enchanting sight.

References

Thiruvananthapuram district